Homestead is a borough in Allegheny County, Pennsylvania. The borough is known for the Homestead Strike of 1892, an important event in the history of labor relations in the United States. The population of Homestead was 2,884 at the 2020 census.

History 

The area on the south bank of the Monongahela River now comprising the boroughs of Homestead, Munhall and West Homestead saw the first white settlers arrive in the 1770s. One hundred years later, much of the existing farmland on the flats and hillsides by the river was purchased, laid out in lots and sold by local banks and land owners to create the town of Homestead. The town was chartered in 1880. The building of a railroad, glass factory, and in 1881 the first iron mill began a period of rapid growth and prosperity. In 1883, Andrew Carnegie bought out Homestead Steel Works, adding it to his empire of steel and coke enterprises. Carnegie had recently acquired a controlling interest in Henry Clay Frick's coke works on the Monongahela, setting the stage for the dramatic labor clash in Homestead.

Homestead gained international notoriety in July 1892 as the site of a violent clash between locked-out steelworkers and hired Pinkerton guards, known as the Homestead Strike. When Henry Clay Frick, manager for Andrew Carnegie, owner of the local Homestead Steel Works, announced in the spring of 1892 that skilled workers would receive a reduction in wages, the advisory committee of the Amalgamated Association of Iron and Steel Workers refused to sign a new contract. Carnegie's management locked the workforce out, declaring that the union would no longer be recognized at the steel works.

To break the strike and secure the mill from the disgruntled workers, industrialist Henry Clay Frick hired hundreds of armed toughs from the Pinkerton National Detective Agency. When barges carrying the Pinkertons arrived at the mill on the morning of July 6, workers and townspeople met them at the riverbanks. Though eyewitness accounts differed on which side first fired a shot, a day-long armed battle ensued which resulted in eleven deaths and dozens of injuries. The governor of Pennsylvania eventually called out the National Guard to restore order to the town and take control of the mill. Frick successfully destroyed the union in Homestead and, by extension, in most of his other steel mills through the nation. The "Battle of Homestead," as the event came to be known, represented a stunning setback for unionization in the highly mechanized steel industry. It also set the stage for the future steel strike of 1919, in which Homestead played an important role.

At the turn of the 20th century, in 1900, the population of Homestead was 12,554 people, of whom some 7,000 were employed in the plants. Due mostly to immigration from Eastern and Southern Europe, by 1910 the population jumped to 18,713, then to 20,452 in 1920. In the first decade of the 20th century, Homestead was studied as part of the sociological Pittsburgh Survey, the results of which were eventually published as Homestead: The Households of a Mill Town.

In 1940, 19,041 people lived in Homestead. During the early 1940s half the population was displaced as the United States government added to the steel mills to have the capacity for armor plating for ships and tanks (preparing for World War II). After the end of the war, a decline in the steel-making industry of the United States took place.

By 1980, it had become difficult to obtain employment at the Homestead Works, which was not producing much steel at that time. In 1986, the mill closed.  The Homestead Works was demolished in the early 1990s, replaced in 1999 by The Waterfront shopping mall. As a direct result of the loss of mill employment, the number of people living in Homestead dwindled. By the time of the 2010 census, the borough population was 3,165. The borough began financially recovering in 2002, with the enlarging retail tax base.

Geography
Homestead is located at  (40.405069, −79.907785). 

Surrounding neighborhoods
Homestead has two land borders, including Munhall to the east and south, and West Homestead to the west.  Across the Monongahela River to the north, Homestead runs adjacent with the Pittsburgh neighborhoods of Squirrel Hill South (direct connection via Homestead Grays Bridge) and Swisshelm Park.

Demographics

As of the 2000 census, there were 3,569 people, 1,607 households, and 843 families residing in the borough. The population density was 6,281.6 people per square mile (2,417.5/km²). There were 2,071 housing units at an average density of 3,645.0 per square mile (1,402.8/km²). The racial makeup of the borough was 42.64% White, 51.30% African American, 0.25% Native American, 2.83% Asian, 0.03% Pacific Islander, 0.22% from other races, and 2.72% from two or more races. Hispanic or Latino of any race were 0.62% of the population.

There were 1,607 households, out of which 24.4% had children under the age of 18 living with them, 23.3% were married couples living together, 24.4% had a female householder with no husband present, and 47.5% were non-families. 42.5% of all households were made up of individuals, and 19.4% had someone living alone who was 65 years of age or older. The average household size was 2.16 and the average family size was 2.99.

In the borough, the population was spread out, with 24.2% under the age of 18, 8.0% from 18 to 24, 25.1% from 25 to 44, 23.8% from 45 to 64, and 18.9% who were 65 years of age or older. The median age was 40 years. For every 100 females, there were 80.1 males. For every 100 females age 18 and over, there were 75.1 males.

The median income for a household in the borough was $16,603, and the median income for a family was $28,314. Males had a median income of $25,500 versus $21,559 for females. The per capita income for the borough was $12,690. About 23.0% of families and 26.6% of the population were below the poverty line, including 31.0% of those under age 18 and 16.8% of those age 65 or over.

Attractions 
Also of interest is the Bost Building, a restored brick structure that served as headquarters for the strikers during the 1892 strike by workers at Carnegie Steel. The Bost Building was declared a National Landmark in 1999. It is located at 621 East Eighth Avenue. It now houses a museum and visitors center of the Rivers of Steel Heritage Area.

The historic St Nicholas Carpatho-Rusyn church is located at 903 Ann Street in Homestead.  The church was built in 1937.  Its domes were built using steel from local mills.

Much of Homestead and some of the surrounding communities are listed on the National Register of Historic Places as the Homestead Historic District. Many churches, commercial buildings, and homes date to the late 19th century or early 20th century and are of architectural and historic interest. Unfortunately, since the closing of the steel mills in the 1980s, the population and business district of Homestead have seriously declined, causing many older buildings to be abandoned. The final nail in the coffin of the formerly thriving business district, mainly along 8th Avenue, was the opening of many big box chain stores and restaurants in the new (1990s) Waterfront development.

The Carnegie Library of Homestead was opened to the public in 1898. This historic building, located on East 11th Avenue in the neighboring borough of Munhall, now houses, in addition to a public library, a music hall and athletic club open to the public. The impressive stone architecture of the building is set off by the surrounding park. The library is one of only three that Andrew Carnegie provided with an endowment. Some claim it was a peace offering to the community following the events of the steel strike in 1892, and that as such it was rejected by Homestead, which is why it is in Munhall instead. In fact, the plans were already in the works for the building of the library before the strike, and the Borough of Munhall had not been incorporated when the library was built.

Also not technically in Homestead proper, but located just west of the borough, is the popular waterpark, Sandcastle, with waterslides, pools and waterside nightclub adjacent to the Monongahela River. This historic amusement park has been a family destination for generations of Pittsburghers. It is home to some of the best known and loved wooden roller coaster rides.

In 2000, Continental Realestate Companies opened The Waterfront.  This large "lifestyle" shopping center was built on the former site of the Carnegie Steel Works.  Most of the structures associated with the steel mills on this site were demolished during construction. Still standing in the Waterfront development are some of the brick stacks from the Homestead Steel Works. In addition, near the river is a former mill structure known as the Pump House which was restored by the developer.

Transportation 
An important state route, Pennsylvania Route 837, runs through Homestead. Interstate 376 is only a few miles away from Homestead. For public transit, the Port Authority of Allegheny County has several bus routes running through Homestead that go to downtown Pittsburgh and to McKeesport.

Homestead is served by three railroads: the Norfolk Southern, CSX Transportation and the Union Railroad. All three used to have large operations when the Homestead steel mill was open. Now that the mill has closed, only one company, WHEMCO, is served by the railroad. The Union Railroad had a large yard to serve the Homestead Works, which is now Waterfront Drive.

Notable people

Charlie Batch, NFL quarterback for the Detroit Lions and Pittsburgh Steelers
William Campbell, business executive
John S. Crawford, member of the Wisconsin State Assembly
Betty Davis, singer, songwriter, and model
Mary Dee, radio personality and disc jockey
Nora Barry Fischer, U.S. district judge for the Western District of Pennsylvania
Jeff Goldblum, actor
Jester Hairston, composer, choral conductor and actor
Orrin Hatch - former Utah senator and President pro tempore of the U.S. Senate
Butch Leitzinger, racing driver
Curt Leskanic, Major League Baseball player for the Colorado Rockies, Milwaukee Brewers, Kansas City Royals, and the Boston Red Sox
Frank McHugh, actor of stage, film, and television, was born in Homestead in 1898.
Joe Mihal, pro football player
Ed Piskor, alternative comics artist, Eisner Award winner
Cumberland Posey, basketball player and Negro league baseball owner, member of both Baseball and Basketball Halls of Fame
John Rice, MLB umpire
Maxine Sullivan, jazz singer
Jim Tomsula, Former NFL head coach for the San Francisco 49ers
Tamara Tunie, actress
Joe Zuger, professional football player for Detroit Lions, Hamilton Tiger Cats

Gallery

References

Further reading
Byington, Margaret F. and Samuel P. Hays. Homestead: The Households of a Mill Town. Pittsburgh: University of Pittsburgh Press (1974). 
Serrin, William.  Homestead: The Glory and Tragedy of an American Steel Town. New York: Vintage (1993).  
Modell, Judith and Charlee Brodsky.  A Town Without Steel: Envisioning Homestead. Pittsburgh: University of Pittsburgh Press (1998).

External links

Homestead, Pennsylvania, 1902 from the Library of Congress via the World Digital Library
BattleOfHomestead.org
HomesteadHebrews.com
SteelValleyAvenues.com

 
1871 establishments in Pennsylvania
Boroughs in Allegheny County, Pennsylvania
Pittsburgh metropolitan area
Pennsylvania populated places on the Monongahela River
Populated places established in 1871